Kings of the Turf is a 1941 American short documentary film about horse racing, directed by Del Frazier. It was nominated for an Academy Award at the 14th Academy Awards for Best Short Subject (One-Reel).

Cast
 Knox Manning as Commentator (voice)

References

External links
 

1941 films
1941 documentary films
Black-and-white documentary films
1941 short films
American horse racing films
American short documentary films
Documentary films about horse racing
1940s short documentary films
American black-and-white films
1940s English-language films
1940s American films